PKI may refer to:

 Partai Komunis Indonesia, the Communist Party of Indonesia
 Peter Kiewit Institute, an Information Technology and Engineering school of the University of Nebraska system
 Protein kinase inhibitor, a type of enzyme inhibitor that specifically blocks the action of one or more protein kinases
 Public key infrastructure, a computer security technology